Alcinous may refer to several people from classical myth and history:

Alcinous, mythological king featured prominently in Homer's Odyssey
Alcinous, son of Hippocoon, who with his father and brothers, expelled Icarius and Tyndareus from Lacedaemon, but was afterwards killed by Heracles
Alcinous (philosopher), Middle Platonist philosopher

It may also refer to:
 11428 Alcinoös, Jovian asteroid
Alcinous, a genus of sea spider and original taxonym of the Aaaaba beetle